Actinoptera biseta is a species of fruit fly in the genus Actinoptera of the family Tephritidae.

Distribution
Sri Lanka.

References

Tephritinae
Insects described in 1956
Diptera of Asia